The 1921 Illinois Fighting Illini football team was an American football team that represented the University of Illinois during the 1921 Big Ten Conference football season.  In their ninth season under head coach Robert Zuppke, the Illini compiled a 3–4 record and finished in a tie for eighth place in the Big Ten Conference. Halfback L. W. Walquist was the team captain.

Schedule

Awards and honors
Otto Vogel, (guard)
All-American, guard
Jack Crangle
All-American, fullback

References

Illinois
Illinois Fighting Illini football seasons
Illinois Fighting Illini football